The qualification event for the 2013 Canadian Olympic Curling Trials (branded as the Capital One Road to the Roar for sponsorship reasons), was held from November 5 to 10 at the Kitchener Memorial Auditorium Complex in Kitchener, Ontario. 

The top two finishers of the men's and women's events qualified to participate in the 2013 Canadian Olympic Curling Trials. The teams played in a triple-knockout tournament where four teams qualified for the playoff round. The first two qualifiers and second two qualifiers played against each other, and the winner of the first game advanced to the Trials. The loser of the first game then played the winner of the second game to determine the second team that would advance to the Trials.

Qualification
Twelve teams qualified for the pre-Trials based on the following criteria:

Men

Women

Men

Teams
The teams are listed as follows:

Knockout Draw Brackets
The draw is listed as follows:

A event

B event

C event

Knockout results
All draw times are listed in Eastern Standard Time (UTC−5).

Draw 1
Tuesday, November 5, 9:00 am

Draw 2
Tuesday, November 5, 7:30 pm

Draw 3
Wednesday, November 6, 2:00 pm

Draw 4
Wednesday, November 6, 7:00 pm

Draw 5
Thursday, November 7, 9:00 am

Draw 6
Thursday, November 7, 2:00 pm

Draw 7
Thursday, November 7, 7:00 pm

Draw 8
Friday, November 8, 9:00 am

Draw 9
Friday, November 8, 2:00 pm

Draw 10
Friday, November 8, 7:00 pm

Draw 11
Saturday, November 9, 9:00 am

Draw 12
Saturday, November 9, 2:00 pm

Playoffs

Qualifier 1
Saturday, November 9, 2:00 pm

Playoff Game
Sunday, November 10, 9:00 am

Qualifier 2
Sunday, November 10, 7:00 pm

Women

Teams
The teams are listed as follows:

Knockout Draw Brackets
The draw is listed as follows:

A event

B event

C event

Knockout results
All draw times are listed in Eastern Standard Time (UTC−5).

Draw 1
Tuesday, November 5, 1:00 pm

Draw 2
Tuesday, November 5, 7:30 pm

Draw 3
Wednesday, November 6, 9:00 am

Draw 4
Wednesday, November 6, 2:00 pm

Draw 5
Wednesday, November 6, 7:00 pm

Draw 6
Thursday, November 7, 9:00 am

Draw 7
Thursday, November 7, 2:00 pm

Draw 8
Thursday, November 7, 7:00 pm

Draw 9
Friday, November 8, 9:00 am

Draw 10
Friday, November 8, 2:00 pm

Draw 11
Friday, November 8, 7:00 pm

Playoffs

Playoff Game
Sunday, November 10, 9:00 am

Qualifier 1
Saturday, November 9, 7:00 pm

Qualifier 2
Sunday, November 10, 2:00 pm

References

External links

2013 in Canadian curling
Sport in Kitchener, Ontario